Paarma is a Finnish surname. Notable people with the surname include:

Jukka Paarma (born 1942), Finnish Archbishop

See also
VL Paarma, Finnish biplane

Finnish-language surnames